Alena Palečková (born 28 April 1947) is a Czech politician and zoologist. A member of the Civic Democratic Party (ODS), Palečková served as Senator for Prague 8 from the establishment of the role in 1996 until 2012, when she did not run for reelection and was replaced by Daniela Filipiová. During her last two years in the senate, she served as Vice-President. Palečková was a Member of the European Parliament between 1 May and 19 July 2004, before the country's first election.

References

1947 births
Women MEPs for the Czech Republic
Civic Democratic Party (Czech Republic) Senators
Charles University alumni
Living people
Politicians from Prague